Perrysville may refer to:

Perrysville, Indiana
Perrysville, Ohio
Perrysville, Pennsylvania

See also
Perryville